Marc Sageman, M.D., Ph.D., is a former CIA Operations Officer (covered as a Foreign Service officer) who was based in Islamabad from 1987 to 1989, where he worked closely with Afghanistan's mujahedin. He has advised various branches of the U.S. government in the War on Terror. He is also a forensic psychiatrist and a counter-terrorism consultant.

He first drew wide attention for his book Understanding Terror Networks, a book that The Economist called "influential." "The most sophisticated analysis of global jihadis yet published. . . . His conclusions have demolished much of the conventional wisdom about who joins jihadi groups."

In Leaderless Jihad: Terror Networks in the Twenty-First Century, Sageman "suggests that radicalization is a collective rather than an individual process in which friendship and kinship are key components." After the book was negatively reviewed by Bruce Hoffman in Foreign Affairs, a debate, which was covered by The New York Times, ensued between him and Sageman. In this debate, Sageman argue that terrorism is now "bottom up" where terrorist act as lone wolf or radicalized person create terrorist structure.

In The London Bombings, Sageman investigates four bombing plots from an intelligence viewpoint: Operation Crevice (in relation to the fertiliser bomb plot), Operation Theseus (which investigated the July 7, 2005 attacks), Operation Vivace (which investigated the failed July 21, 2005 plot) and Operation Overt (in relation to the liquid bomb airline plot). Reviewed by Dr Anthony Richards, Royal Holloway College in 'Perspectives on Terrorism'

Published works
 Understanding Terror Networks (Philadelphia: University of Pennsylvania Press, 2004)
 Leaderless Jihad: Terror Networks in the Twenty-First Century (Philadelphia: University of Pennsylvania Press, 2008)
 Misunderstanding Terrorism (Philadelphia: University of Pennsylvania Press, 2016)
 The London Bombings (Philadelphia: University of Pennsylvania Press, 2019)

See also
 Operation Cyclone

References

External links
 Common Myths about al-Qaida Terrorism
 Understanding Terror Networks

Harvard University alumni
New York University Grossman School of Medicine alumni
Forensic psychologists
Counterterrorism theorists
American psychiatrists
Living people
American expatriates in Pakistan
Year of birth missing (living people)